Driss Dahak ( - born 15 August 1939, Ksar el-Kebir) is a Moroccan civil servant, and diplomat. He held the cabinet position of General Secretary of the Government from 2008 to 2017, under prime ministers Abbas El Fassi and Abdelilah Benkirane.

See also
Cabinet of Morocco

References

Living people
Government ministers of Morocco
1939 births
Moroccan civil servants
People from Ksar el-Kebir
20th-century Moroccan judges
Moroccan educators
Ambassadors of Morocco to Syria
Moroccan diplomats
Member of the Academy of the Kingdom of Morocco